The Sagadat Nurmagambetov Military Institute of the Kazakh Ground Forces ( / Құрлық әскерлерінің әскери институты), formerly known as the Alma-Ata Higher Combined Arms Command School – is one of the leading educational institutions in the military education system of the Kazakh Ground Forces. The military academy is based in Almaty, Kazakhstan.

History

Soviet Union  
The Military Institute of Land Forces history began from the Alma-Ata Higher Combined Arms Command School which had been established on 1 September 1970 on the grounds of the Resolution of the Presidium of the Supreme Soviet of the USSR. It was formed on the basis of the 186th Motor Rifle Regiment of the 68th Motor Rifle Division in the 13th Military Garrison of Alma-Ata. Due to the fact that with the opening of the school, cadets continued their studies for the 2nd year of study, the first graduation of lieutenants took place on 25 July 1973. By order of the Minister of Defense Andrei Grechko on 1 July 1973, the school was named after the Marshal of the Soviet Union Ivan Konev. In the 1980s, a significant number of ABOKU graduates was sent to serve in Afghanistan.

Independence  
After the collapse of the USSR, the school remained an official academic institution of the Republic of Kazakhstan. On 11 February 1997, by the decree of President Nursultan Nazarbayev, the school was reorganized into the Military Institute of the Land Forces. By late February 2002, remnants of the former school were separated from the military academy. On 31 October 2003, the school was renamed the Military Institute of the Ground Forces. On 11 September 2020, it was given a special honorific which made it full name the "Military Institute of the Ground Forces named after Hero of the Soviet Union, People's Hero, the first Minister of Defense of Kazakhstan, General of the Army Sagadat Nurmagambetov".

Multidisciplinary training 
Due to the fact that there were no military schools in the Kazakh SSR that trained officers for the Soviet Army with the exception of the ABOKU, the leadership of armed forces created faculties on the basis of the ABOKU to train officers in other specialties. Currently, the Military Institute is training officers in 13 specialties under the program of a higher military educational institution with a training period of four years:
 Command 
 Motorized rifle troops
 Airborne troops and military intelligence
 Tank troops
 Artillery troops
 Specialties in combat support 
 Engineer troops
 Specialties in logistics support
 Missile and artillery support of troops
 Motor vehicle support
 Food supply
 Clothing support
 Combustive-lubricating support
 Repair and maintenance
 Officers of educational structures
 Military translation business

Foreign Cooperation 

Due to the fact that Kazakhstan, which is a member of the Collective Security Treaty Organization, associate members like Tajikistan, which only has the Military Institute of the Ministry of Defense, can according to interstate agreements, attend courses at the institute. According to the said agreements, annually sends 7-10 special soldiers for training. For example, in 2019, nine officers of the Armed Forces of the Kyrgyz Republic and 10 officers of the Armed Forces of the Republic of Tajikistan graduated from the Military Institute.
In July 2008, in a Kazakhstan-NATO cooperation plan, the first Partnership for Peace training center in Central Asia called the Kazakhstan Center (Kazcent) was opened in the Military Institute of Ground Forces. The center’s main objective is to train the relevant military personnel designated to participate in peacekeeping operations, and its curriculum includes courses on English military terminology in multinational operations, NATO administrative procedures, and military-civilian interaction.

Many cadets of the Foreign Language Department at the United States Military Academy at West Point on their Foreign Academy Exchange Program spend their time at the institute.

Rectors 
The following are a list of rectors:
Vachakan Vlasov (1970-1978)
Anatoly Nekrasov (1978-1988)
Vladimir Ponomarev (1988-1992)
Abay Tasbulatov (1992-2002)
Lieutenant General Bakhytzhan Ertaev (February-March 2002)
Major General Alikhan Jarbulov (March 2002-November 2003)
M. Sikhimov (December 2003-February 2005)
Z. Kuangaliev (February 2005-2007)
Major General Alikhan Jarbulov (2007-January 2009)
S. Kudaibergenov (January 2009-October 2011)
A. Tasbulatov (October 2011-February 2013)
N. Kuatov (February 2013-October 2014)
Major General Vasiliy Ryspaev (October 2014-October 2016)
Colonel Serik Asanov (October 2016–present)

Notable alumni 

Murat Maikeyev - Chief of the General Staff of the Armed Forces of the Republic of Kazakhstan
Saken Zhasuzakov - Minister of Defense of Kazakhstan
Abibilla Kudayberdiev - Minister of Defense of Kyrgyzstan
Movses Hakobyan - Chief of General Staff of Armenian Armed Forces
Kanat Azimbaev - Head of the Honor Guard of the Republican Guard of Kazakhstan
Talgat Berdigulov - Director of the Presidential Orchestra of the State Security Service of the Republic of Kazakhstan.
Mirab Kishmaria - Minister of Defence of Abkhazia

See also 
 West Point
 Bundeswehr Command and Staff College
 Hetman Petro Sahaidachnyi National Ground Forces Academy

References

External links 
 Alummni website
 40-летие АВОКУ

Educational institutions established in 1970
Military academies of Kazakhstan